Juan Conrads was a Chilean shot put champion in the 1930s.

He represented Chile in the 1931 South American Championships in Athletics.

Later he became a businessman and started Inchalam, Chile's major steel wire and nail producer, together with Victor and Jorge Matetic.

References 
 https://web.archive.org/web/20080619075722/http://www.estadio.latinowebs.com/photo4.html
http://www.memoriachilena.cl/archivos2/pdfs/MC0059491.pdf  page 11

External links
 Inchalam's website

Possibly living people
Year of birth missing
Chilean male shot putters